Since 1 January 2022, the Vosges department of France has counted twelve public establishments for intercommunal cooperation (EPCI) with their administrative seats in the department, two agglomerated community and 10 communautés de communes. Two of these intercommunalities also encompass communes located in other departments. One additional commune, Vicherey, is part of the communauté de communes du Pays de Colombey et du Sud Toulois whose administrative seat is located in the Meurthe-et-Moselle department.

List of current intercommunalities

Evolution of intercommunalities

References 

 
Vosges